The 1980 New South Wales Rugby Football League premiership was the 73rd season of Sydney's professional rugby league football competition, Australia's first. Twelve clubs, including six of 1908's foundation teams and another six from around Sydney competed for the J.J. Giltinan Shield and WD & HO Wills Cup during the season, which culminated in a grand final between the Canterbury-Bankstown and Eastern Suburbs clubs. NSWRFL clubs also competed in the 1980 Tooth Cup and players from NSWRFL clubs were selected to represent the New South Wales team.

Season summary
Twenty-two regular season rounds were played from March till August, resulting in a top five of Easts, Canterbury, Wests, St. George and Souths who battled it out in the finals.

The 1980 season also saw the retirement from the League of future Australian Rugby League Hall of Fame inductee, Arthur Beetson.

Mid-way through the season, players contracted to NSWRFL clubs were selected to represent the New South Wales team in two games against the Queensland team in 1980. After that the experimental 1980 State of Origin game was played, and NSWRFL clubs' players represented Queensland for the first time.

The 1980 season's Rothmans Medallist was Newtown prop Geoff Bugden. The inaugural Dally M Award, named in honour of rugby league's first "Master" Dally Messenger, went to South Sydney's Robert Laurie. Rugby League Week gave its player of the year award to Eastern Suburbs' halfback Kevin Hastings.

Teams

Ladder

Finals

Chart

Grand final
Canterbury's loss of long serving fullback Stan Cutler with a broken leg suffered in the major semi-final, and the Roosters' form in the preliminary final resulted in Easts being warm favourites. But the Bulldogs, boasting two sets of brothers in the Hughes and Mortimers came ready to play expansive football. The Roosters began well and Noel Cleal was a constant threat but Canterbury's forwards led by Robinson and Coveney began to get on top. Canterbury's Chris Anderson scored the first try of the match after receiving a blatantly forward pass from Chris Mortimer in the lead up. The Roosters hit back and only desperate cover defence from Steve Mortimer on Easts' winger Steve McFarlane prevented a Roosters try. Ken Wright kicked two penalty goals for the tricolours, resulting in a 7–4 lead to the Bulldogs at half time.

After the break Steve Gearin edged the Bulldogs clear with three successive goals after aggressive play from the Roosters – led by John Tobin's focus on the Hughes brothers – was penalised by referee Greg Hartley. The final Canterbury try by Gearin has been ranked amongst the best of all-time. Five minutes from full-time Greg Brentnall raced downfield and put up a high kick. Gearin followed through at speed and outjumped opposing winger David Michael, catching the ball on the full to score and secure a Bulldogs victory.

It was Canterbury's third premiership and had come after a wait of thirty-eight years. It was the last Grand final to be played on a Saturday afternoon with the deciders since then being played on a Sunday.

Referee: Greg Hartley

Canterbury-Bankstown 18 (Tries: Anderson, Gearin. Goals: Gearin 6 from 6)

Eastern Suburbs 4 (Goals: Wright 2)

Player statistics
The following statistics are as of the conclusion of Round 22.

Top 5 point scorers

Top 5 try scorers

Top 5 goal scorers

See also
1980 State of Origin

References

External links
 Haddan, Steve (2007) The finals – 100 Years of National Rugby League Finals, Steve Haddan Publishing, Brisbane
Rugby League Tables – Season 1980 The World of Rugby League
at rabbitohs.com.au
1980 J J Giltinan Shield and WD & HO Wills Cup at rleague.com
MSWRFL season 1980 at rugbyleagueproject.com

New South Wales Rugby League premiership
NSWRFL season